Kyriakos or Cyriacus (ca. 750) was a ruler of the Nubian kingdom of Makuria. While some authorities place his reign between Merkurios and Zacharias I, according to Severus of El Ashmunein, Kyriakos succeeded Markos.

Around 748, Kyriakos marched north into Egypt as far as Fustat (Cairo) at the head of an army said to number 100,000 men to free the Patriarch of Alexandria Michael, whom the Governor of Egypt, Abd al-Malik ibn Marwan ibn Musa bin Nusayr, had thrown into prison. However, once the Makurian army reached Egypt, the Patriarch was released from prison, along with Kyriakos' envoy, who was then dispatched to Kyriakos to ask him to return to Makuria.

References

Nubian people
Kingdom of Makuria
8th-century monarchs in Africa